Million Dollar Band may refer to:

Million Dollar Band (marching band), of the University of Alabama
Million Dollar Band (country music group), that often performed on the Hee Haw TV variety show 1980–1988